The 2017 Ladies Open Dunakeszi was a professional tennis tournament played on outdoor clay courts. It was the first edition of the tournament and was part of the 2017 ITF Women's Circuit. It took place in Dunakeszi, Hungary, on 28 August–3 September 2017.

Singles main draw entrants

Seeds 

 1 Rankings as of 21 August 2017.

Other entrants 
The following players received a wildcard into the singles main draw:
  Anna Bondár
  Dalma Gálfi
  Judith van Kessel
  Ana Bianca Mihăilă

The following players received entry from the qualifying draw:
  Gréta Arn
  Ágnes Bukta
  Jessika Ponchet
  Anastasia Pribylova

The following player received entry as a lucky loser:
  Panna Udvardy

Champions

Singles

 Dayana Yastremska def.  Katarina Zavatska, 6–0, 6–1

Doubles
 
 Irina Bara /  Chantal Škamlová def.  Alexandra Cadanțu /  Tereza Smitková, 7–6(9–7), 6–4

External links 
 2017 Ladies Open Dunakeszi at ITFtennis.com
 Official website

2017 ITF Women's Circuit
2017 in Hungarian women's sport
Tennis tournaments in Hungary